Several calendars have been used in pre-Islamic Arabia. Inscriptions of the ancient South Arabian calendars reveal the use of a number of local calendars. At least some of these South Arabian calendars followed the lunisolar system. For Central Arabia, especially Mecca, there is a lack of epigraphic evidence, but details are found in the writings of Muslim authors of the Abbasid era. Some historians maintain that the pre-Islamic calendar used in Central Arabia was a purely lunar calendar similar to the modern Islamic calendar. Others concur that the pre-Islamic calendar was originally a lunar calendar, but suggest that about 200 years before the Hijra it was transformed into a lunisolar calendar, which had an intercalary month added from time to time to keep the pilgrimage within the season of the year when merchandise was most abundant.

Pre-Islamic day names
The names for the days of the week in pre-Islamic Arabia were changed during the era of Islam to correspond to the 7 days Allah created the world, as recounted in the book of Genesis, first chapter. Prior to this, the pre-Islamic Arabian days of the week were:

Pre-Islamic month names
Sources for the names of these pre-Islamic months are al-Muntakhab min Gharīb Kalām al-ʿArab<ref>'Al-muntakhab min gharīb kalām alʿarab] Cairo: Dār al-fajr li-n-nashr wa-t-tawzīʿ, 1989.</ref> by Ḥasan of Abū al-Ḥasan ʿAlīy bin al-Ḥasan bin al-Ḥusayn al-Hunāʾī ad-Dūsā (d. 309 A.H./921 C.E.), better known as "Kurāʿ an-Naml", and Lisān al-ʿArab of Ibn Manẓūr (d. 711 A.H./1311 C.E.). Al-Biruni and al-Mas'udi suggest that the Ancient Arabs used the same month names as the Muslims, though they also record other month names used by the pre-Islamic Arabs.

Occasions

Some suggested that the Arab pilgrimage festivals in the seventh and twelfth months were originally equinoctial festivals and research on the pre-Islamic calendar has been summarized in recent Islamic and secular scholarship which equates the pre-Islamic months from Muharram to Dhu al-Hijjah with the Hebrew religious months of Iyyar (second) to Nisan (first) respectively (Ramadan corresponding to the Fast of Adam in Tevet) rather than Nisan (first) to Adar (twelfth) as might otherwise be presumed.    In stark opposition to this opinion however, subsequent Christian then Jewish scholars have both tried to equate the pre-Islamic months from Muharram to Jumādā ath-Thāniya at least with the Hebrew months of Tishrei to Adar I respectively. Nevertheless, the Islamic position equating Nisan with Dhū al-Ḥijja has prevailed.  Nisan is the month of spring in the Hebrew calendar and Babylonian calendar, which are both lunisolar calendars with either 12 or 13 months.

Four forbidden months

The Islamic tradition is unanimous in stating that Arabs of Tihamah, Hejaz, and Najd distinguished between two types of months, permitted (ḥalāl) and forbidden (ḥarām) months. The forbidden months were four months during which fighting is forbidden, listed as Rajab and the three months around the pilgrimage season, Dhu al-Qa‘dah, Dhu al-Hijjah, and Muharram. A similar if not identical concept to the forbidden months is also attested by Procopius, where he describes an armistice that the Eastern Arabs of the Lakhmid ruler, al-Mundhir II, respected for two months in the summer solstice of 541 AD/CE. However, Muslim historians do not link these months to a particular season.

Nasi'

The Qur'an links the four forbidden months with Nasi' (an-nasīʾ), a word that literally means "postponement". According to Muslim tradition, the decision of postponement was administered by the tribe of Kinanah, by a man known as the al-Qalammas of Kinanah and his descendants (pl. qalāmisa).

Different interpretations of the concept of Nasī’ have been proposed. Some scholars, both MuslimAccording to "Tradition", repeatedly cited by F.C. De Blois. and Western,A. Moberg, "NASI'", The Encyclopaedia of Islam, 2nd, VII: 977. maintain that the pre-Islamic calendar used in Central Arabia was a purely lunar calendar similar to the modern Islamic calendar. According to this view, Nasī’ is related to the pre-Islamic practices of the Meccan Arabs, where they would alter the distribution of the forbidden months within a given year without implying a calendar manipulation. This interpretation is supported by Arab historians and lexicographers, like Ibn Hisham, Ibn Manzur, and the corpus of Qur'anic exegesis.

This is corroborated by an early Sabaic inscription, where a religious ritual was "postponed"  (ns'’w) due to war. According to the context of this inscription, the verb ns'’ has nothing to do with intercalation, but only with moving religious events within the calendar itself. The similarity between the religious concept of this ancient inscription and the Qur'an suggests that non-calendaring postponement is also the Qur'anic meaning of Nasī’. Thus the Encyclopaedia of Islam concludes "The Arabic system of [Nasī’ can only have been intended to move the Hajj and the fairs associated with it in the vicinity of Mecca to a suitable season of the year. It was not intended to establish a fixed calendar to be generally observed."Others concur that it was originally a lunar calendar, but suggest that about 200 years before the Hijra it was transformed into a lunisolar calendar containing an intercalary month added from time to time to keep the pilgrimage within the season of the year when merchandise was most abundant. This interpretation was first proposed by the medieval Muslim astrologer and astronomer Abu Ma'shar al-Balkhi, and later by al-Biruni,al-Biruni, "Intercalation of the Ancient Arabs", The Chronology of Ancient Nations, tr. C. Edward Sachau, (London: William H. Allen, 1000/1879), pp. 13–14, 73–74. al-Mas'udi, and some Western scholars. This interpretation considers Nasī’ to be a synonym to the Arabic word for "intercalation" (kabīsa). The Arabs, according to one explanation mentioned by Abu Ma'shar, learned of this type of intercalation from the Jews. The Jewish Nasi'' was the official who decided when to intercalate the Jewish calendar. Some sources say that the Arabs followed the Jewish practice and intercalated seven months over nineteen years, or else that they intercalated nine months over 24 years; there is, however, no consensus among scholars on this issue.  The metonic cycle of 19 years was established for intercalating the Hebrew calendar since the time of their exile in Babylonian, and it was also observed in the Babylonian calendar as well, starting in the same period. The Kinānah tribe, during the time of Muhammad, was in charge of authorizing the intercalation; that the Kinānah tribe had taken over this task from the Kinda tribe, which had been Judaized for hundreds of years previously, lends credence to the position that the process of intercalation may have been borrowed from the Jewish tradition.
Referring to Abū Rayḥān al-Bīrūnī (d. ca. 442 A.H./1050 C.E.), it has been posited that this intercalation was effected in order to accommodate the scheduling of seasonal trade cycles with annual pilgrimages, 

The prohibition of nasi' in AH 10 has been suggested as having had the purpose of wresting power from the Kinānah clan who was in control of intercalation, but there is no consensus regarding this position.

See also 
 Islamic calendar
 Solar Hijri calendar
 Assyrian calendar
 Persian calendar
 Rumi calendar
 Arabic names of Gregorian months

References 

Specific calendars
Calendar
Lunisolar calendars
Lunar calendars
Arab inventions
Islamic calendar